The Princess Diaries is the first volume of the series of the same name by Meg Cabot.  It was released in 2000 by Harper Collins Publishers, and later became a film of the same name starring Anne Hathaway.

Summary
Mia Thermopolis is an average urban ninth grader. She lives in Greenwich Village with her single, liberal mother, who is a semi-famous painter, but Mia puts on her Doc Martens one at a time, and the most exciting things she ever dreams about are kissing senior Josh Richter ("six feet of hotness") and passing Algebra. Mia's father comes to town and drops a major bomb: he's not just a European politician as he's always led her to believe, but actually the prince of a small country. And Mia, his only heir, is now considered the crown princess of Genovia. She doesn't even know how to begin to cope: "I am so NOT a princess.... You never saw anyone who looked less like a princess than I do. I mean, I have really bad hair... and... a really big mouth and no breasts and feet that look like skis." Mia's troubles are  worsened: her mother has started dating her algebra teacher (Frank Gianini), the paparazzi are showing up at school, and she has a fight with her best friend Lilly. After this they don't talk for a while and become distant from each other. Mia goes to her Grand-mère's Plaza Hotel room in order to begin princess training, where she starts to develop into a great princess. Throughout the story Mia also makes another friend named Tina, who is shunned because of her overprotective father, who makes her have a bodyguard.

Plot Summary
Mia Thermopolis is an average urban ninth grader living in Greenwich Village with her single, liberal mother and semi-famous painter, Helen Thermopolis. She begins keeping a journal after her mother begins dating her Algebra teacher, Mr. Gianni, whose subject Mia is currently failing. Mia has a crush on Josh Richter, the boyfriend of popular cheerleader Lana Weinberger, who often makes fun of her, though she also unknowingly harbours feelings for Michael, the brother of her best friend Lilly Moscovitz.

Mia's father, Philippe Renaldo, who has recently recovered from testicular cancer, pays a visit. He reveals to Mia that he is the prince of Genovia, a small European principality. As he is no longer able to have children, Mia is now his sole heir to the throne and the princess of Genovia.

Mia refuses to move to Genovia so she and her father form a compromise; she will remain in New York with her mother during term-time but spend her holidays in Genovia and attend daily princess lessons with her formidable grandmother, the Dowager Princess Clarisse Renaldo. After Clarisse gives Mia a makeover, Lilly reacts negatively, causing Mia to befriend Tina Hakim Baba, the daughter of a Saudi Arabia oil sheik who is shunned at school due to the presence of her bodyguard.

Mia at first hides the truth of her royal status from her peers at school; however her secret is revealed after her grandmother sells the truth to the press, after which Philippe insists on her being accompanied by a bodyguard, Lars. Josh Richter breaks up with Lana and asks Mia to the Cultural Diversity Dance. Mia grows disillusioned with Josh during their date and realises he is only using her for the publicity after he deliberately kisses her in front of the paparazzi. After Mia confronts him, Lilly apologises to Mia and she and Tina encourage Mia to enjoy the rest of the dance with her friends, including Michael. Mr. Gianni informs Mia that she has managed to bring her Algebra grade up from an F to a D and Mia realises her feelings for Michael.

Characters
Mia Thermopolis: Describes herself as a five-foot nine, flat chested, freshman, freak; also known as Amelia Mignonette Grimaldi Thermopolis Renaldo, Princess of Genovia. Mia loves to write, has a tendency to obsess over everything that happens to her, is a vegetarian, identifies as a feminist and is currently failing algebra and many other subjects.

Grandmere: Mia's grandmother, who loves Sidecars, is highly critical of everyone around her. She has a hairless poodle, Rommel, and she calls Michael Moscovitz that boy. Her full name is The Dowager Princess Clarisse Renaldo. Mia and her Grandmother don't get along with each other for most of the story.

Lilly Moscovitz: Mia's bossy activist best friend, who has her own television cable show, Lilly Tells It Like It Is.

Michael Moscovitz: Lilly's older brother, who is extremely smart and according to Mia, is attractive. Also Mia's crush.

Lana Weinberger: Head cheerleader, initially Josh's girlfriend, dislikes Mia and puts her down throughout the book.

Josh Richter: Mia's crush, "six feet of unadulterated hotness." Originally dating Lana at the beginning of the story, he is shown to have manipulative tendencies.

Helen Thermopolis: Mia's quirky painter mother, who surprises Mia by dating her algebra teacher. She is described as irresponsible.

Philippe Renaldo: Mia's royal father, who is the prince of Genovia. He had Mia out of wedlock, and is constantly annoyed by his domineering mother, has many girlfriends, and tells Mia that she is a princess after he is no longer able to have children because he had cancer.

Tina Hakim-Baba: A girl whom Mia befriends throughout the novel. Her father is an oil man sheikh who is worried that she will get kidnapped. She originally is shunned because her overprotective father forces her to have a bodyguard (Wahim), but she and Mia quickly become close.

Frank Gianini: Mia's algebra and homeroom teacher and he dates her mother, Helen. Mia grows to appreciate his after-school algebra review sessions, and though their relationship begins awkwardly, Mia and Mr. G seem to get along well.

Lars: Mia's bodyguard. He follows her almost everywhere and lives in the Plaza. Has some serious blackmail on Mia, having followed her around everywhere.

Fat Louie: Mia's very fat cat who is attracted to anything shiny.

2000 American novels
American young adult novels
The Princess Diaries novels
American novels adapted into films
Novels set in New York City
Greenwich Village
HarperCollins books